Hoda Elsadda is Chair in the Study of the Contemporary Arab World at the University of Manchester. She serves as Co-Director of the Centre for the Advanced Study of the Arab World (CASAW) in the UK, Associate Editor of the Online Edition of the Encyclopedia of Women and Islamic Cultures, member of the Board of Directors of the Global Fund for Women, member of the Advisory Board of the Durham Modern Languages Series, and Core Group Member of the Arab Families Working Group. Elsadda is also the Co-founder and current Chairperson of the Board of Trustees of the Women and Memory Forum.

She has previously held the position of Professor of English and Comparative Literature at the Faculty of Arts at Cairo University. She is a former member of the editorial board of the International Journal of Middle East Studies (IJMES), the Advisory Committee for the Anna Lindh Euro-Mediterranean Foundation for the Dialogue Between Cultures, a former member of the National Council for Human Rights in Egypt, a former board member of the Egyptian Organization for Human Rights and a former member of the Core Team of the Arab Human Development Report. In 1992, she co-founded and co-edited Hagar, an interdisciplinary journal in women's studies published in Arabic. She has written articles and edited books dealing with discourses on gender in modern Arab history, particularly in the late nineteenth and early twentieth century. Her research focuses on gender and culture in the Middle East, Arab women's writing, oral histories, women’s creative writing, comparative literature, and Arabic literature and popular culture.

Education
B.A. English, Cairo University
M.A. English and Comparative Literature, American University in Cairo
Ph.D. English Literature, Cairo University

Women and Memory Forum
Elsadda co-founded the Women and Memory Forum (WMF) in 1996. WMF consists of a group of women scholars, researchers, and activists who strive to produce and disseminate alternative cultural knowledge of women in Arab cultures throughout history and in contemporary society. The group advocates for the promotion of gender as an analytical framework to help combat negative stereotypes of Arab women in the cultural sphere. According to their website, “The long-term objective of WMF's specialized research is to produce and make available alternative cultural information about Arab women that can be used for raising awareness and empowering women.”

Selected publications

Books

Edited Books

Articles

See also
Arabic Literature
Human Rights
Egypt
Women in Islam
Women in Arab societies
Gender Studies

References

External links
University of Manchester faculty bio

Living people
Egyptian feminists
Academic staff of Cairo University
Academics of the University of Manchester
Cairo University alumni
International relations scholars
Feminist studies scholars
Year of birth missing (living people)
Women political scientists